Henry Hannington (15 January 1797 – 4 October 1870) was an English academic and cleric, who was also a  first-class cricketer.

Life
The son of the Rev. John George Hannington, Rector of Hampton Bishop, Herefordshire, he was educated at Eton College, and went to King's College, Cambridge as a scholar in 1817. There he was made a Fellow in 1820, graduating B.A. in 1822; M.A. in 1825. He remained a Fellow until his death; he was bursar of King's 1824–38.

Ordained deacon in 1822 and priest in 1823, Hannington never took a living. He died on 4 October 1870, at 11 Onslow Crescent, South Kensington.

Cricket
Hannington was a cricketer associated with Cambridge University Cricket Club who is recorded in two matches, totalling 117 runs with a highest score of 63, completing one stumping and taking 2 wickets. With Charles Oxenden he founded the Club in 1820.

References

English cricketers
English cricketers of 1787 to 1825
Cambridge University cricketers
1797 births
1870 deaths
People educated at Eton College
Alumni of King's College, Cambridge
Fellows of King's College, Cambridge
19th-century English Anglican priests